Aglaé Louise Françoise Gabrielle de Polignac (7 May 1768 – 30 March 1803) was the daughter of Gabrielle de Polastron, the favourite and confidante of Marie Antoinette, and her husband, the 1st duc de Polignac.

Life 
Aglaé was born in Paris in 1768, her parents were Comte and Comtesse Jules de Polignac. Her paternal grandparents were Marquis Louis Héracle Melchior de Polignac (1717–1792) and his wife, Diane Marie Adelaide Zephirine Mazzarini-Mancini (1726–1755). Her maternal grandparents were Jean François Gabriel, comte de Polastron, and his wife, Jeanne Charlotte Hérault.

Aglaé Louise was born at the Château de Versailles in Paris, France, the eldest child and only daughter of the Duke and Duchess of Polignac. She had three brothers: Armand Jules Marie Héracle, duc de Polignac (11 January 1771 – 1 March 1847); Jules Auguste Armand Marie, prince de Polignac (14 May 1780 – 30 March 1847); and Camille Henri Melchior, comte de Polignac (27 December 1781 – 2 February 1855).

At the Château de Versailles, on 11 July 1780, at the age of twelve, Aglaé married twenty-five-year-old Antoine-Louis, the duc de Gramont et Guiche. She then became the Duchess of Guiche and was nicknamed "Guichette" by her family. Her son Antoine-Geneviève-Héraclius-Agénor de Gramont became the 9th Duke of Gramont. Her daughter Corisande Armandine Léonie Sophie de Gramont married Charles Bennet, 5th Earl of Tankerville, and another daughter, Aglaé Angélique Gabrielle de Gramont, was married in turn to Russian general Alexander Lvovich Davydov and French diplomat Horace Sébastiani.

In 1794, according to The Memoirs of Madame Vigée Lebrun, Marie-Élisabeth-Louise Vigée-Le Brun painted a half-length portrait of the Duchess de Guiche wearing a blue turban, in Directoire style. She wrote: "…I encountered the Duchesse de Guiche, whose lovely face had not changed in the least."

On 30 March 1803, Aglaé de Polignac died in an accidental house fire at her home in Edinburgh, Scotland.

Popular culture
In Riyoko Ikeda's shōjo manga The Rose of Versailles and its anime adaptation, Aglaé is renamed Charlotte and is depicted killing herself rather than marry the Duc de Guiche (who is depicted as much older than in reality) at her mother's behest. Rosalie Lamorlière is depicted, ahistorically, as her illegitimate half-sister.

References

External links

1768 births
1803 deaths
18th-century French people
Accidental deaths in Scotland
Deaths from fire
People from Versailles
Aglae